More Things in Heaven is a science fiction novel  by British writer John Brunner, published in 1973 by Dell Books. It is partly based on an earlier work, The Astronauts Must Not Land copyrighted in 1963 by Ace Books. The title is taken from Shakespeare's Hamlet Act 1. Scene V.

Plot
A matter transmission machine seems to work properly when it sends things and people out.   But when it brings them back, the astronauts have been changed unexpectedly. The machines might not be working properly. Or maybe they are working too well.

1973 science fiction novels
1973 British novels
Dell Publishing books